WAGY (1320 AM) is a radio station broadcasting a rock and roll Oldies format. Licensed to Forest City, North Carolina, United States, the station is currently owned by Calvin and Teresa Hastings, through licensee KTC Broadcasting, Inc.

F.M. translator

External links
 

AGY